is a Japanese historical slice of life josei manga series written and illustrated by Hozumi. It was serialized in Shogakukan's Flowers manga magazine and was compiled in 2 volumes published in 2013. It will be published in French by Glénat.

Story
The original manga tells the story of the van Gogh brothers - the famous painter Vincent van Gogh, and his younger brother Theodorus van Gogh - but primarily from the point of view of his younger brother. Theo is employed as the branch manager of the famous art dealership Goupil & Cie. He seeks to embrace new talents and techniques, but the bourgeoisie mentality of the time deems the lower classes unable to appreciate fine art, marking it as a domain exclusive to high society. Theo struggles to showcase art that depicts the truth of the everyday.

Characters
Théodorus Van Gogh
Vincent van Gogh
Paul Gauguin
Monsieur Baudrillard
Jean Santro
Jean Gérôme

Volumes
1 (May 10, 2013)
2 (November 8, 2013)

Musical
A stage musical adaptation of Hozumi's Sayonara Sorcier manga has been green-lit in 2015. The musical took place in Tokyo in March 2016. Daisuke Nishida directed the production, and Shuhei Kamimura (Student Council's Discretion) composed the music.
The musical held its first run at the Zepp Blue Theater in Roppongi, Tokyo from March 17 to 21 in 2016. The staff released the musical on DVD and Blu-ray Disc in Japan on August 3.

The official website for the stage musical adaptation of Hozumi's Sayonara Sorcier manga announced on December 9, 2016, that the musical will get a new run at Tokyo's Theatre 1010 from March 17 to 20 in 2017. 
Daisuke Nishida will again direct the play and pen the script, and Shuhei Kamimura (Student Council's Discretion) will again compose the music. 
All of the announced cast so far are returning from the first run. The cast includes:

Shinji Rachi as Theodorus van Gogh
Ryō Hirano as Vincent van Gogh
Kimeru as Paul Gauguin
Akira Kubodera as Monsieur Baudrillard
Masaki Gōda as Jean Santro
Yōhei Izumi as Jean Gérôme

Reception
Volume 2 reached the 32nd place on the weekly Oricon manga chart and, as of November 17, 2013, has sold 39,410 copies.

It was number 1 on the 2014 Kono Manga ga Sugoi! Top 20 Manga for Female Readers survey and was a runner-up on the top 50 manga on the 15th Book of the Year list by Da Vinci magazine.

See also
Shiki no Zenjitsu, another manga by the same author

References

2013 manga
Historical anime and manga
Josei manga
Shogakukan manga
Slice of life anime and manga
Works set in the 19th century
Art in anime and manga